Roseville, Kentucky may refer to the following places in Kentucky:
Roseville, Barren County, Kentucky
Roseville, Hancock County, Kentucky